Jordan Luce (born 30 November 1993, in Le Lamentin, Martinique, French West Indies) is a wheelchair basketball player. Born with pseudoarthrosis of the right tibia, Luce moved to France at 16 to pursue a career in basketball. He is a 4.5 classified player.

Wheelchair basketball 
Luce was first introduced to wheelchair basketball in a rehabilitation center at 15. He represented France for the first time in 2012 in the Men's European Championships (Group B), where they won gold. Jordan played the 2013/2014 season in the UK with the RGK Wolverhampton Rhinos winning the British Superleague. He currently plays for Léopards de Guyenne in Bordeaux, France.

References

En Route Pour Rio
Léopards de Guyenne
Handisport Fédération Française Magazine (n°156 • Juin - Août 2014)

Martiniquais men's basketball players
1993 births
Living people
French men's wheelchair basketball players